Caleb Baldwin may refer to:

Caleb Baldwin (boxer) (1769–1827), English lightweight boxer
Caleb Baldwin (judge) (1824–1876), Chief Justice of the Iowa Supreme Court
Caleb Cook Baldwin (1820–1911), American Presbyterian missionary
Caleb Dodd Baldwin, partner in the Pennsylvania architecture firm of Dodd & Baldwin

See also
Caleb Baldwin House, historic hall and parlor plan house in Beaver, Utah
Caleb Baldwin Tavern, historic house in Newtown, Connecticut